Christalino Atemona (born 6 May 2002) is a German professional footballer who plays as a centre-back for Kortrijk.

Career
Atemona is a youth product of Reinickendorfer Berlin, before moving to the youth academy of Hertha in 2014. He began his senior career with Hertha II in 2020, and was promoted to train with the senior team in September 2021. On 3 January 2023, he transferred to the Belgian club Kortrijk. He made his professional debut with Kortrijk in a 1–0 Belgian Cup loss to Mechelen on 11 January 2023.

International career
Born in Germany, Atemona is of Angolan descent. He is a youth international for Germany, having played up to the Germany U20s.

References

External links
 
 

2002 births
Living people
People from Regen (district)
German footballers
Germany youth international footballers
German people of Angolan descent
Hertha BSC II players
K.V. Kortrijk players
Association football defenders
Regionalliga players
Belgian Pro League players
German expatriate footballers
German expatriates in Belgium
Expatriate footballers in Belgium